Walter Gastón Coyette (born 28 January 1976 in Avellaneda) is an Argentine ex-footballer and manager.

Career
Coyette started his career with Club Atlético Lanús in 1994, he made 113 appearances and scored 7 goals during his three spells with the club the club. In 1995, he was part of the Argentina U-20 squad that won the 1995 FIFA World Youth Championship and in 1996 he helped Lanús to win the Copa CONMEBOL. Throughout his career, he played for clubs in Argentina, Spain, Mexico and Ecuador.

Coaching career
Coyette started his coaching career at Club de Gimnasia y Esgrima La Plata in 2010 as assistant manager for Diego Cocca. He later followed Cocca as his assistant to Santos Laguna in Mexico in February 2011  and then Club Atlético Huracán in September 2011.

Coyette then hired as a field assistant coach for the U15, U17 and U20 youth national teams, before becoming head coach of the U15 national team in 2015. On 10 June 2016, Coyette was appointed manager of Chacarita Juniors on a one-year deal, the same team where he had retired as a professional player. After a period of bad results, Coyette decided to resign in December 2017. After his time at Chacarita, he assumed as coach of San Martín de San Juan, which he directed for only 14 games before being fired after a bad start. Days after his departure, he took charge of San Martín de Tucumán. He was fired in February 2019.

On 17 September 2019, Coyette was appointed manager of Chilean club Unión La Calera. On 5 December 2019 it was confirmed, that Coyette had left the position due to personal reasons.

Returning to Argentina after his spell in Chile, Coyette was appointed manager of Alvarado at the end of June 2020. After a period of bad results, Coyette decided to step down from his position on 28 March 2022.

Titles

References

External links
 Argentine Primera statistics  
 Football-Lineups player profile
 En Una Baldosa profile 

1976 births
Living people
Sportspeople from Avellaneda
Argentine footballers
Argentine football managers
Argentine expatriate football managers
Argentina under-20 international footballers
Argentina youth international footballers
Association football midfielders
Club Atlético Lanús footballers
Club Atlético Platense footballers
Atlas F.C. footballers
CD Leganés players
Argentinos Juniors footballers
Unión de Santa Fe footballers
S.D. Quito footballers
Quilmes Atlético Club footballers
Chacarita Juniors footballers
Liga MX players
Argentine Primera División players
Argentine expatriate footballers
Argentine expatriate sportspeople in Spain
Argentine expatriate sportspeople in Mexico
Argentine expatriate sportspeople in Ecuador
Expatriate footballers in Spain
Expatriate footballers in Mexico
Expatriate footballers in Ecuador
Club Atlético Huracán footballers
Chacarita Juniors managers
San Martín de San Juan managers
San Martín de Tucumán managers
Unión La Calera managers
Expatriate football managers in Chile